The Indianapolis mayoral election of 1971 took place on November 2, 1971. This was the first election after the creation of the Unigov. Incumbent Republican Richard Lugar was reelected to a second term. Lugar's challenger had been Democrat John Neff, a former state senator. Neff had campaigned in opposition to the Unigov, promising to seek its abolishment if elected.

Election results

See also
Electoral history of Richard Lugar

References

1971
1971 United States mayoral elections
1971 Indiana elections